The 2014–15 Bangladesh Premier League is also known as Manyavar Bangladesh Premier League due to the sponsorship from Manyavar. It was the 8th season of the Bangladesh Premier League since its establishment in 2007. A total of 11 teams compete in the league.

Sheikh Jamal Dhanmondi Club are the defending champions, having won their Bangladesh Premier League title the previous season. Farashganj SC and Rahmatganj MFS entered as the two promoted teams.

Teams

Stadiums and locations
The league matches were held on a home and away basis of the following stadiums but the first round matches were held exclusively at the Bangabandhu National Stadium in Dhaka.

Personnel and sponsoring

Foreign players

Matches

Round 1
Match 1

Match 2

Match 3

Match 4 

Match 5

Round 2
Match 6

Match 7 

Match 8 

Match 9

Match 10

Round 3
Match 11

Match 12

Match 13

Match 14

Match 15

Round 4
Match 16

Match 17

Match 18

Match 19

Match 20

Round 5
Match 21

Match 22

Match 23

Match 24

Match 25

Round 6
Match 26

Match 27

Match 28

Match 29

Match 30

Round 7
Match 31

Match 32

Match 33

Match 34

Match 35

Round 8

Match 36

Match 37

Match 38

Match 39

Match 40

Round 9
Match 41

Match 42

Match 43

Match 44

Match 45

Round 10
Match 46

Match 47

Match 48

Match 49

Match 50

Round 11
Match 51

Match 52

Standings

League table

Season statistics

Goalscorers

Own goals 
† Bold Club indicates winner of the match

Hat-tricks 

4  Player scored 4 goals.

References

Bangladesh Football Premier League seasons
Bangladesh
Bangladesh
1